Nully is a commune in the Haute-Marne department in north-eastern France.

The two villages of Nully and Trémilly were merged into a single commune from 1 December 1972 to 1 January 2005; they are now two separate communes.

See also
Nully-Trémilly
Communes of the Haute-Marne department

References

Communes of Haute-Marne